Shoei College may refer to:
Shoei Girls' Junior and Senior High School, a junior and senior high school for girls in Shirokanedai, Minato, Tokyo
Shoei Junior College in Kobe